The Recession of 1953 was a recession in the United States that began in the second quarter of 1953 and lasted until the first quarter of 1954. The total recession cost roughly $56 billion. It has been described by James L. Sundquist, a staff member of the Bureau of the Budget and speech-writer for President Harry S. Truman as "relatively mild and brief."

Preceding the recession
The recession from 1953 to 1954 occurred because of a combination of events during the earliest parts of the 1950s. In 1951, there was a post-Korean War inflationary period and later in the year more funds were transferred into national security. Further inflation was expected into 1952 and the Federal Reserve set in motion restrictive monetary policy.

Causes
The expected inflation never happened, but the policy was still implemented. During this time, the Treasury also lengthened the maturity of the national debt and pursued flexible interest rate policies. Alongside these policies, the Treasury also began to do debt-refunding which only increased interest rates further and subsequently issued a low percentage bond. The Federal Reserve recognized the increasing interest rates and decided to allow more reserves to be available. This worked, but interest rates plummeted sending the US into a demand-driven recession of output and employment. GDP declined because of government spending and investment.

Type of recession
The recession of 1953 was demand-driven because the dramatic changes of interest rates earlier in the year led to an increase in pessimism towards the economy which led to a decrease in aggregate demand. Before the Federal Reserve stepped in to increase availability of reserves, the increase in interest rates continued to decrease aggregate demand. And finally, the actions of the Federal Reserve led to an increase in consumer expectation of an inevitable recession which led to an even further drop in aggregate demand and an increase in savings. Thus, the recession of 1953 began on the demand side.  The sharp three quarter decline with a clear trough, followed by a sharp recovery means that the 1953 recession is an example of a V-shaped recession.

See also
Lists of recessions

References

Further reading

External links
Bureau of Economic Analysis
Business Cycle Expansions and Contractions

Recessions in the United States
1953 in the United States
1954 in the United States
1953 in economics
1954 in economics
Presidency of Harry S. Truman
Presidency of Dwight D. Eisenhower